Immaculata Academy was a private, Roman Catholic high school for girls in Hamburg, New York within the Diocese of Buffalo.

Background
Immaculata Academy was established in 1928  by the Franciscan Sisters of St. Joseph and closed June 2016. More than 4,200 girls attended the school during this time. While functioning, the school was the "sister school" to St. Francis High School. After the school closed, a luxury apartment complex was opened on its site, with mostly new buildings but using the school's gym.

References

External links
 School Website

Catholic secondary schools in New York (state)
Educational institutions established in 1928
Girls' schools in New York (state)
High schools in Erie County, New York
1928 establishments in New York (state)